Ararat General Cemetery is a cemetery located in the rural city of Ararat, Victoria in Australia.

Notable interments
 Monga Khan, "Afghan" hawker 
 Sidney Jeffryes, wireless operator for the Australasian Antarctic Expedition
 Bill Wallace, oldest prisoner died aged 107

War graves
The cemetery contains the Commonwealth war graves of 6 Australian services personnel, 3 from World War I and 3 from World War II.

References

External links
 
 Ararat Cemetery – Billion Graves
  Ararat Cemetery Trust Australian cemeteries
 Ararat - www.ozburials.com

Cemeteries in Victoria (Australia)
Ararat, Victoria